Augustus Keppel may refer to:

 Augustus Keppel, 1st Viscount Keppel (1725-1786), Admiral Royal Navy
 Augustus Keppel Stephenson (1827-1904), Treasury Solicitor
 Augustus Keppel, 5th Earl of Albemarle (1794-1851), MP for Arundel